Jacob Ernest "Spanner" Spence (21 September 1918 – 29 March 2007) was an Australian rules footballer who played with Carlton in the Victorian Football League (VFL).

Notes

External links 

Ernie Spence's profile at Blueseum

1918 births
2007 deaths
Carlton Football Club players
Australian rules footballers from Victoria (Australia)
Yarraville Football Club players